A profiterole, cream puff (US), or chou à la crème is a filled French and Italian choux pastry ball with a typically sweet and moist filling of whipped cream, custard, pastry cream, or ice cream. The puffs may be decorated or left plain or garnished with chocolate sauce, caramel, or a dusting of powdered sugar. Savory profiterole are also made, filled with pureed meats, cheese, and so on. These were formerly common garnishes for soups.

The various names may be associated with particular variants of filling or sauce in different places.

Preparation 

Choux pastry dough is piped through a pastry bag or dropped with a pair of spoons into small balls and baked to form largely hollow puffs. After cooling, the baked profiteroles are injected with filling using a pastry bag and narrow piping tip, or by slicing off the top, filling them, and reassembling. For sweet profiteroles, additional glazes or decorations may then be added.

Presentation

The most common presentations are pastry cream, whipped cream, or ice cream filling, topped with powdered sugar or chocolate ganache and possibly more whipped cream. They are also served plain, with a crisp caramel glaze, iced, or with fruit.

Filled and glazed with caramel, they are assembled into a type of pièce montée called croquembouches, often served at weddings in France and Italy, during the Christmas holiday in France, and are served during important celebrations in Gibraltar. Profiteroles are also used as the outer wall of St. Honoré Cake.

History
Choux pastry, the key ingredient of profiteroles, is said to have been invented by the head chef to the court of Catherine de' Medici, who had come to France from her native Florence to marry Henry II.

The original recipe changed as the years passed, as the pastry cook's art began to develop around the 17th century. A patissier by the name of Avice perfected the pastry in the middle of the eighteenth century and created choux buns, with the 'pâte à Popelin' becoming known as 'pâte à choux', since only choux buns were made from it. It was in the nineteenth century that Antoine Carême perfected the recipe, the same recipe for choux pastry as is used today.

Today

Cream puffs have appeared on U.S. restaurant menus since at least 1851. 

The Wisconsin State Fair is known for its giant cream puffs.

In popular culture
Profiteroles are served in the banquet scene in the 2017 film Victoria and Abdul in which Queen Victoria is  seen to be taking great pleasure in devouring her serving of them.

Cream puffs are heavily implied to be the favourite treat of Hanyū in the Japanese murder mystery sound novel series Higurashi no Naku Koro ni. Cream puffs are often mentioned and used as a payment method or a sign of gratefulness towards her, throwing cream puffs away as a threat. In Hanyū's character song 'Nano Desu~' she also clearly states "I love, I love, I really love Chou à la crème!".

In the 1989 film The Cook, The Thief, His Wife & Her Lover, profiteroles are a favorite treat of the titular wife, Georgina Spica.

See also
 
 Bossche bol, a giant profiterole from the Dutch city of Den Bosch
 Éclair, a differently-shaped choux and cream pastry
 Gougère, an hors d'oeuvre made with choux pastry
 List of French desserts
 Moorkop, a similar Dutch pastry

References

External links
 

Custard desserts
French desserts
French pastries
Choux pastry
Stuffed desserts

pl:Ptyś